The yellow conger (Rhynchoconger flavus) is an eel in the family Congridae (conger/garden eels). It was described by George Brown Goode and Tarleton Hoffman Bean in 1896. It is a marine, tropical eel which is known from the Gulf of Mexico and the mouth of the Amazon River, in the western Atlantic Ocean.

References

Congridae
Fish described in 1896